Galenia pubescens (Galenia or Coastal Galenia) is a low-growing perennial herb in the family Aizoaceae.  It is native to southern Africa and naturalised elsewhere.

Description
The species is prostrate or decumbent with ovate to spatulate leaves which are covered with hairs when young. The flowers are white with a slight pink tinge and yellow with age.  These are followed by capsules which contain shiny, black seeds to 1 mm in length.

Naturalisation
In Australia the species is naturalised in Western Australia, South Australia, the Northern Territory, Tasmania, Victoria and New South Wales. In New South Wales, the species is regarded as a noxious weed in the Liverpool Plains and Tamworth regions under the Noxious Weeds Act 1993.

The species is disliked by some beekeepers - although it produces nectar profusely and bees like it, the nectar makes honey taste slightly bitter.

References

Aizoaceae
Flora of Southern Africa